The Other Side of Here is an  science fiction novel by American writer Murray Leinster, first published as a five-part Astounding Stories serial in 1936, under the title "The Incredible Invasion". It was first published in book form, in a "thorough revision", as one side of an Ace Double, in 1955. While no further American editions have been issued, the novel has been translated into Italian (L'altra dimensione, 1955), Spanish (Ataque desde la Cuarta Dimensión, 1956), French (L'autre côté du monde, 1958) and German (Invasion aus einer anderen Welt, 1959). The novels tells the story of "an invasion from the fourth dimension", foiled by an insurrection against the invaders' home government.

Reception
Groff Conklin praised Other Side on its 1956 publication, as "a vivid, galloping melodrama based on his favorite theme of alternate worlds". P. Schuyler Miller's review was more tepid, saying "It would have been great stuff twenty years ago; it's merely smooth stuff now." Anthony Boucher dismissed the novel as "for completists only".

E. F. Bleiler wrote that the novel, in its original form as The Incredible Invasion, was "Good in [the] beginning, but the perpetual chase and backtracking lose conviction after a time. The characterizations are not as strong as is usual with Leinster. . . All in all, not worth reading except as a period piece. Academic critic David Seed praised Leinster for "cleverly the ambiguous role of the media in selectively reporting the news and also in juggling the popular interpretations of the invasion".

References

1936 American novels
1955 American novels
1936 science fiction novels
1955 science fiction novels
American science fiction novels
Novels by Murray Leinster
Novels first published in serial form
Works originally published in Analog Science Fiction and Fact
Invasion literature
Ace Books books